The Walterdale Playhouse is an amateur live performance venue in the Old Strathcona neighborhood of Edmonton. In 2008 the venue celebrated 50 year of theater. The theatre is mainly run by donations and volunteers in the community.

History
The Walterdale Playhouse was founded in 1959 by the Walterdale Theatre Associates it is one of Western Canada's oldest amateur theatre groups. Since 1974 Walterdale Theatre Associates has been located in the heart of Old Strathcona in the oldest fire hall in Alberta, Strathcona Firehall No. 1 (later Edmonton No. 6), which the Associates converted into the Walterdale Playhouse. Built in 1909, the firehall is now designated a Provincial Registered Historical Resource. This venue seats 145. In 1994 the theatre received an award for "Outstanding Contribution to Performing Arts". To those in the Edmonton community it is a meaningful part of the arts and theatre culture enjoyed within the city.

References

External links
Official Site

Fire stations completed in 1909
Theatres in Edmonton
1959 establishments in Alberta
Provincial Historic Resources in Edmonton
Defunct fire stations in Canada